Pəzməri (also, Pazmari and Pezmeri) is a village and municipality in the Ordubad District of Nakhchivan, Azerbaijan. It is located in the near of the Ordubad-Unus highway, 37 km in the north-west from the district center. Its population is busy with gardening, vegetable-growing, beekeeping and animal husbandry. There are secondary school, club, library and a medical center in the village. It has a population of 158.

Etymology
The name of the village is from the word of pəzməri (block, a part of the village) from the dialect of Nakhchivan.

References

External links 

Populated places in Ordubad District